Olshany is a town in Republic of Belarus, located in Stolin District, Brest Region. Its documental records began in 1392.

History
In 2009, the town of Olshany became an agrotown.

External links

 Olshany at Radzima.org
 Olshany at tut.by

References

Towns in Belarus
Populated places in Brest Region
Stolin District